McCauley Rock is a rock,  high, situated just off the eastern edge of Lexington Table,  north of Mount Zirzow, in the Forrestal Range of the Pensacola Mountains, Antarctica. It was mapped by the United States Geological Survey from surveys and U.S. Navy air photos, 1956–66, and was named by the Advisory Committee on Antarctic Names for Clyde J. McCauley, a U.S. Navy seaman at Ellsworth Station, winter 1957.

References

Rock formations of Queen Elizabeth Land